Noorjehan Razack is an Indian politician. She served as a Member of Parliament representing Tamil Nadu in the Rajya Sabha the upper house of India's Parliament as a member of the AIADMK from 1977 to 1983.

References

1939 births
Living people
Rajya Sabha members from Tamil Nadu
All India Anna Dravida Munnetra Kazhagam politicians
Women in Tamil Nadu politics
Women members of the Rajya Sabha
Tamil Nadu politicians